Anita Bergman is a Canadian politician, who sat in the Legislative Assembly of Saskatchewan from 1994 to 1995. A member of the Saskatchewan Liberal Party caucus, she represented the electoral district of Regina North West.

Bergman was first elected in a by-election in 1994, following the resignation of John Solomon. In the 1995 election, she ran for reelection in the redistributed riding of Regina Qu'Appelle Valley, but was defeated by Suzanne Murray.

References

Living people
Politicians from Regina, Saskatchewan
Saskatchewan Liberal Party MLAs
Women MLAs in Saskatchewan
20th-century Canadian women politicians
1945 births